The Briarcliff Manor Fire Department (BMFD) provides fire protection and emergency medical services to the village of Briarcliff Manor, New York and its hamlet Scarborough. The volunteer fire department also serves unincorporated areas of Ossining and Mount Pleasant. The fire department has three fire companies, two stations, and four fire engines. Its engines include three pumpers and a tower-ladder; the department also maintains other vehicles, including a heavy rescue vehicle. The Briarcliff Manor Fire Department Ambulance Corps provides emergency medical transport with two ambulances. The fire department is headquartered at the Briarcliff Manor Village Hall, with its other station in Scarborough, on Scarborough Road.

The Briarcliff Steamer Company No. 1 was founded in 1902 by Frederick C. Messinger. He became the first chief of the department, founded February 10, 1903. In 1906, the Briarcliff Fire Company was established. The village's municipal building and first permanent firehouse was built in 1914 in downtown Briarcliff Manor. Seven years later, in 1921, the Scarborough Fire Company was established. From 1930 to 1971, the Archville Fire Department was dissolved into Scarborough's fire company, which expanded its fire protection to Archville. In 1936, the Briarcliff Manor Hook and Ladder Company was formed. For the department's 50th anniversary, the village hosted numerous events, including a parade with twelve fire departments present. In 1963, the Briarcliff Manor Village Hall was constructed, again housing the fire and police departments. In 1974, a replacement firehouse was built for the Scarborough Engine Company. The fire department's 75th anniversary in 1976 drew a parade of 650 firemen from fourteen companies. In 1982, one of the most notable fires took place, in Briarcliff's downtown. The fire lasted three and a half hours and took over a hundred firefighters to control. The department also participated in fighting the Briarcliff Lodge fire in 2003, which demolished the 1902 Walter Law-built hotel. In 2010, Scarborough's firehouse was again replaced, doubling its size.

Organization 

Operationally, the department is nominally organized into three fire companies, each led by a chief:
 Briarcliff Fire Company
 Briarcliff Manor Hook & Ladder Company
 Scarborough Engine Company

The fire department has two stations; its headquarters at the Briarcliff Manor Village Hall (housing the Briarcliff fire companies) and another on Scarborough Road (housing the Scarborough Engine Company). The department has approximately 150 members, including a fire chief and two assistant chiefs who are paid nominally and are not village employees. The department's fire district protects about 8,000 residents, and spans  within Briarcliff Manor and unincorporated portions of the towns of Ossining and Mount Pleasant.

Ambulance corps 
The Briarcliff Manor Fire Department Ambulance Corps operates two state-certified ambulances with basic life-support capabilities. The corps answers over 500 emergencies per year and participates in the Tri-Community Fly Car Program to provide advanced life support.

History

Early 1900s 

Briarcliff Manor's fire company existed for more than a year before Briarcliff Manor's incorporation. Frederick C. Messinger (a fireman in Kingston for ten years) and thirteen local men founded the private fire company in 1901. Thirty-six men became the company's charter members on March 4, 1902, and dues were set at 25 cents per month. On April 15 of that year, the company took the name Briarcliff Steamer Company No. 1. The company's first equipment was a 1901 hand-drawn chemical apparatus, with a tank containing a mixture of water and sodium bicarbonate. Sulfuric acid would be added to the tank, creating carbon dioxide, which would propel the solution through the hose and help extinguish the fire. That first apparatus was white, which Messinger thought more visible than the conventional red in a village without street lights, and the village's engines remain white.

The chemical apparatus was only suitable for small fires, and was supplemented in 1902 with a steam-operated pumper and a hose wagon, both horse-drawn. The two pieces of equipment were purchased by Walter Law's Briarcliff Realty Company and were loaned to the fire company without charge. At the time, the fire company housed its equipment and horses at the Briarcliff Farms' Barn A (present-day St. Theresa's School) and used the Wheelwright shop as a meeting room and for social events.

After the village was incorporated, the company petitioned the village board to form the company into a village fire department. Their request was granted on February 10, 1903. In 1906, the village counsel advised reorganization, and the Briarcliff Fire Company was created in the office of Walter Law, with Messinger again serving as Foreman. The fire equipment, totaling $55.93 ($ in ), was transferred to the new company. In 1908, American LaFrance sold a hook-and-ladder truck and two-wheeled hose-and-chemical truck (both horse-drawn) to the fire department for $2,700 ($ in ). In the following year an alarm bell was purchased, replacing first a suspended railway iron and sledgehammer in a barn, which was followed by an ineffective steam whistle.

In the first decade of the 1900s, the Archville Fire Company was formed in neighboring Archville, New York, with the company headquarters in a shed on the corner of Albany Post Road (current U.S. Route 9) and Union Street. The company's original equipment consisted of thirty 3½ gallon galvanized buckets, and later a 50-gallon horse-drawn pumper purchased from the Valhalla Fire Department. The company was chartered in 1909 as the Archville Fire Department, with Hubert W. Mannerly as the first fire chief. From then until 1930 the Archville department was autonomous, until Briarcliff Manor requested that Archville provide its fire protection services to Scarborough. In 1930, the Archville department changed its name to the Scarborough Fire Company and became part of the Briarcliff Manor Fire Department, although no contract had been signed and neither party expressed intentions to formalize the arrangement. In 1972, the company was split into two units, with an autonomous Archville unit and the Scarborough Engine Company, headquartered in the Scarborough Presbyterian Church garage and a part of the Briarcliff Manor Fire Department.

After a large fire at Miss Knox's School (site of the Briarcliff Corporate Campus) in 1912, the department's equipment was upgraded to deal with larger fires. The village purchased its first motorized vehicle, an American LaFrance pumper truck. The existing hose-and-chemical wagon was motorized and became the chief's car. In 1914, the Briarcliff Manor Municipal Building was constructed to house the government and fire engines. The likeness of its garage doors can be seen in the façade of the present restaurant. Later in 1914 the department established sub-stations at Mrs. Whitson's barn on Pleasantville Road and on the Holden farm at Scarborough Road (roughly opposite the current firehouse); these were discontinued in 1921. The first major fire to involve the motorized vehicles was in 1916 at the central business district. In spite of the new equipment, several buildings at the northern end were destroyed. The 1908 hook-and-ladder truck was motorized in 1923 and two years later, the chief's car was replaced by another American LaFrance vehicle. An electric siren was installed in 1928 after a complaint that the previous alarm sounded more like a call to breakfast than an alarm of fire. In 1928, another downtown fire caused $150,000 in damages, to two grocery stores, the plumbing shop owned by Fred Messinger, a restaurant, and a cottage. Briarcliff and Ossining firefighters saved the nearby Municipal Building, though the homes of Fire Chief Joseph Johnson and a police lieutenant were destroyed.

During the Great Depression, uniforms were again nonstandard, similar to the early years of the fire department. Another American LaFrance hook-and-ladder truck was ordered in 1930 to go along with the 1908 truck, and another pump truck was purchased from the same company in 1935. Five years later, the 1912 pumper truck was sold, and was replaced with a Mack squad and patrol truck. In 1936, the village tradition of the testing of the fire alarm at noon began; it was sounded on each day except Sunday. In the same year, due to a dispute over fire chief elections, the Briarcliff Manor Hook and Ladder Company was formed, separate from the Engine Company. During the 1930s, the department had organized a basketball team which played other departments and the Scarborough company formed a rivalry with the Briarcliff ones. In 1939, the department ordered the 1940 Mack squad and patrol truck for $6,375 ($ in ); it is still used as a department antique.

During World War II, more than 340 of the village's 1,830 residents served in the United States Armed Forces. The Hook and Ladder Company waived fees and dues for those enlisted from 1941 onward. Such a sufficient number of firefighters was serving the armed forces that the village requested volunteers ages 16–18 to join the Briarcliff Manor Fire Department; at least nine served on active duty during the war and had the ability to excuse themselves from school (which was then located adjacent to Law Memorial Park) if the fire siren went off. Also during the war, in 1944, the department received a trailer-type pump unit with a 500-gallon pump, hose, nozzle, ladders, and other tools. It was loaned to the village by the Office of Civil Defense and was an auxiliary to the existing equipment. One year later, Briarcliff High School graduate and Briarcliff Fire Company lieutenant Sgt. Arthur J. Quinn, Jr. of the 45th Division was killed in action in Germany.

The first ambulance was purchased in 1945 after a number of residents expressed the need for it. It was ordered in July 1945 for $5,000 ($ in ), and was delivered in 1947 and ended up costing $6,000 ($ in ). The ambulance had a Meteor body and Cadillac chassis, and provided for two bed patients and two stretcher cases. Ossining later purchased the ambulance to start their own ambulance corps. In May 1946, a dinner was held to honor the returning veterans of World War II. In the same year, the village purchased all loaned fire equipment, and purchased a new Mack pumper truck (the first Engine 92) in May 1947 to replace the 1929 chemical truck.

Late 1900s – present 

1951 was the 50th anniversary of the fire department, and so the village held a week-long celebration beginning on July 1, 1950, with a morning service at the Briarcliff Congregational Church, a band concert at Law Park, and a Fourth of July parade with 5,500 spectators, with a march led by Fred Messinger, followed by eight ex-chiefs. The parade included Scarborough's first fire engine (the red hand-pumped 1901 truck), many bands, and twelve fire departments from Westchester County municipalities. The ex-chief's dinner that evening drew 85 guests. In that year, it was noted that there were not yet any resident deaths from fires within village boundaries. In the late 1950s, Edna O'Brien was the first; trapped in her house and surrounded by intense flames. In 1955, the department purchased a new pumper and a Mack hook-and-ladder truck with a 75 ft. ladder for $40,000 ($ in ). Also in the mid-1950s, a new firehouse was decidedly needed, and more urgently when the weight of the then-new pumper and ladder trucks ruptured the municipal building's floor. For five years, the equipment was housed in Briarcliff and Ossining garages until late 1963, when the new firehouse and municipal offices building was completed. Also in the 1950s, additional sirens were installed for firemen outside of the central siren's range, both on Schrade and at the intersection of Long Hill and Scarborough roads, replacing a siren at Scarborough Presbyterian. During the 1960s the old municipal building's cupola bell, which the department used as a fire bell and which had tolled at the end of the World Wars, was moved to the front of the new firehouse.

Around 1971, the Archville-based Scarborough Fire Company stopped responding to Briarcliff fire alarm calls and resisted taking required training courses. Additionally in 1971, Briarcliff's government tried to charge Archville $200 per year ($ per year in ) for the four existing hydrants and water supply in the hamlet, which Archville reacted in objection to. Briarcliff Manor contacted the State Controller, who instructed the village that Briarcliff Manor's existing arrangement was not in accordance with any state law; that since the Scarborough station was outside of village boundaries, the Scarborough company could not be affiliated with the village fire department. Archville's fire protection district refused to lease the station and equipment from Briarcliff, and thus the Briarcliff Board of Trustees terminated the Scarborough Fire Company's membership in the Briarcliff Manor Fire Department and severed its protection responsibility over Archville. In September 1972, the Briarcliff Manor Board of Trustees formed the Scarborough Engine Company. The company purchased a Mack pumper in 1974. In 1974, the company moved from the church garage to a new $110,725 brick firehouse on Scarborough Road, by architects Pellaton and Chapman. The village government funded the firehouse; members purchased and constructed the furnishings.

1976 was the department's 75th anniversary, and its celebrations included a parade from Willow Drive to the firehouse with 650 firemen from fourteen companies, women's auxiliaries, and 500 members from thirteen bands all marching. In 1978, a new ambulance was purchased at $32,750 ($ in ); a Yankee body on a Ford truck chassis, with an oxygen system, suction system, and a pulse tachometer. The old ambulance was kept as an auxiliary. A year later, the village purchased a new $160,000 ($ in ) ladder truck, delivered in 1983 and replacing the 1936 truck.

During the 1980-81 Iran hostage crisis, the department's fire whistle was blown sixty-six times, once for each released hostage. A year later, one of the most notable fires in the village happened at about 10 pm on January 22, 1982, in the village central business district. The fire began in the basement of Briarcliff Stationers and destroyed the Briarcliff Country Store, Briar Rose, and the Shoe Bazaar. More than a hundred Briarcliff Manor, Pleasantville, and Ossining firefighters assisted to control the fire, which continued to burn at heights of 30–40 feet at midnight, but was under control by 1:30 am. Damage was estimated at $500,000 ($ today).  Also in 1982, the first Briarcliff Manor fire with active female volunteers was fought, with Debra Ann Conacchio and Rachel Higgins serving as firefighters in the department.

In 1996, the department ordered a rescue truck for $194,448 ($ today) from 3-D Manufacturing, and a Pierce pumper truck was purchased at $312,777 ($ today) for Scarborough to replace their corroding 1974 Mack truck. A year later, the department hosted the Westchester County Volunteer Firemen Association Convention, the usual parade with 43 departments, a golf outing, and the annual meeting and dinner of the Association. During the September 11 attacks in 2001, the department sent some of its engines to the Bronx to cover for units that had left for the World Trade Center.

On September 20, 2003, the original wing of the Briarcliff Lodge caught fire. The owner, Barrington Venture, had planned to raze the 100-year-old building and construct a 385-unit senior living center, which was opposed by local historians and architects. The fire thus ended the preservation effort. The fire started near the main entrance and was suppressed by mid-day; it was deemed suspicious by fire officials. Residents began calling at 6:37 am, after noticing smoke coming from the site. The Briarcliff Manor Fire Department was the first to arrive, at 6:40 am, later followed by Ossining, Sleepy Hollow, Millwood, Pleasantville, Chappaqua, Croton, and Pocantico Hills, totaling about 150 firefighters. The fire also spread to the lodge's 9-story west wing, through its wooden attic even though a concrete block firewall stood between both sections. The fire departments contained the fire to prevent it from spreading north or to the village water tower, and therefore saved the water tower and village and commercial radio antennae. After the fire, Westchester County's Cause & Origin Team sent an arson investigative unit, which sifted through the debris along with trained dogs, and found no evidence of arson. Contemporary portions of the lodge and other campus buildings were later demolished.

On October 1, 2010, the department dedicated the Scarborough firehouse, which was rebuilt in one year at the cost of $1.3 million. The department preserved the old foundation to save on construction costs. Upgrades included a second bay, a meeting room, 14-foot-high garage ceilings, and expanded parking. In 2015, the department traded in its 1999 ambulance for a $7,000 deduction to a company in Holbrook, New York while purchasing a new ambulance for $207,763. In 2016, the department retired its 1991 pumper and purchased a Seagrave Marauder II for $724,419. In 2018, the department's chief Michael Garcia, an Ossining resident, was convicted of embezzlement of $120,000 of department funds. Garcia had resigned one year prior, and a finance committee was created to oversee future department finances.

Until 2021, the fire department was required to source 55 percent of its volunteers from within municipal boundaries. Due to the village's small size and its stations' proximity to other municipalities, and amid difficulty recruiting volunteers for the department, a state law was passed exempting the fire department from the membership requirement.

Alarm receiving and transmittal 
The central siren is located at the Briarcliff Manor Village Hall. Since the 1950s, additional sirens have been located on Schrade Road and at the intersection of Long Hill and Scarborough roads. Firemen also are issued small radio receivers to send a signal of a fire's location and which trucks should be sent. Company officers additionally have two-way radios.

Current apparatus 
The Briarcliff Manor Fire Department has one tower ladder, three class-A pumpers, one heavy rescue vehicle, two ambulances, three chief's cars, a utility truck, and an antique engine. The department also has a trailer for safety demonstrations.

Retired apparatus 
In 2015, the department retired and traded in its 1999 ambulance when purchasing its 2016 replacement. The following year, the department retired its 1991 pumper and a mass casualty decontamination unit trailer acquired through a Federal Emergency Management Agency grant, donating the latter to the New York Guard.

Notable people 

 Novelist John Cheever lived in Scarborough, and served in the fire department.
 Children's author C. B. Colby lived on Pine Road and served as chief of the hook and ladder company, as the village's fire commissioner, and as village trustee.
 Ely Jacques Kahn, Jr., a writer for The New Yorker, lived in Scarborough for more than 20 years, and was a member of the department.
 Architect Don Reiman was also a member of the department.

See also 
 Briarcliff Manor, New York

Notes

References

Further reading 

  For further information on the history of the Briarcliff Manor Fire Department.

1901 establishments in New York (state)
Ambulance services in the United States
Briarcliff Manor, New York
Emergency services in New York (state)
Fire departments in New York (state)
Medical and health organizations based in New York (state)